Pool B of the 2022 Billie Jean King Cup Americas Zone Group I was one of two pools in the Americas zone of the 2020–21 Billie Jean King Cup. Four teams competed in a round robin competition, with the top teams and the bottom teams proceeding to their respective sections of the play-offs: the top teams played for advancement to 2022 Billie Jean King Cup Play-offs.

Standings 

Standings are determined by: 1. number of wins; 2. number of matches; 3. in two-team ties, head-to-head records; 4. in three-team ties, (a) percentage of matches won (head-to-head records if two teams remain tied), then (b) percentage of sets won (head-to-head records if two teams remain tied), then (c) percentage of games won (head-to-head records if two teams remain tied), then (d) Billie Jean King Cup rankings.

Round-robin

Paraguay vs. Ecuador

Mexico vs. Chile

Paraguay vs. Chile

Mexico vs. Ecuador

Paraguay vs. Mexico

Chile vs. Ecuador

References

External links 
 Fed Cup website

2022 Billie Jean King Cup Americas Zone